Susan Paulette Casteras is an American art historian, educator, and curator. Casteras is Professor of Art History Emeritus from the University of Washington. She is a specialist on British art, particularly Victorian art and Pre-Raphaelitism.

Career
Born to John and Pauline Troyanovich, Casteras received a Bachelor of Arts in Art History and English Literature from Vassar College in 1971, as summa cum laude and Phi Beta Kappa. She then earned three degrees in Art History from Yale University: a Master of Arts in 1973, a Master of Philosophy in 1975, and a Doctor of Philosophy in 1977. Her doctoral dissertation was on Victorian art, under the direction of George L. Hersey.

Upon graduating, Casteras was appointed Assistant Curator of Paintings at the Yale Center for British Art. In 1991, she was promoted to Curator for five years. Simultaneously, she was also Lecturer of Art History at her alma mater. She then began her professorial career at the University of Washington, where she was named Professor of Art History Emeritus upon retirement.

Personal life
In 1976, Casteras married the lawyer Eric Schnapper.

Selected works
Images of Victorian Womanhood in English Art, 1987 
English Pre-Raphaelitism and its Reception in America in the 19th Century, 1990 
James Smetham: Artist, Author, Pre-Raphaelite Associate, 1995 
The Grosvenor Gallery: A Palace of Art in Victorian England, 1996

See also
List of University of Washington people
List of Vassar College people
List of Yale University people

References

External links
University of Washington profile

Living people
Year of birth missing (living people)
American art curators
American art historians
Women art historians
Vassar College alumni
Yale Graduate School of Arts and Sciences alumni
Yale University faculty
University of Washington faculty
American women curators